Giovanna Giordano (12 November 1961) is an Italian writer and journalist. She has three award-winning and critically acclaimed novels published to date: Trentaseimila giorni (Thirty-six Thousand Days), Un volo magico (A Magic Flight) and Il Mistero di Lithian (The Mystery of Lithian). Her first novel Cina cara io ti canto, unpublished, was a finalist for the fifth annual Premio Calvino, recommended by Gesualdo Bufalino.

Life and career
Giovanna Giordano was born in Messina in 1961 and raised in Milan, the daughter of the scientist Nicola Giordano. She studied African Art History and teaches Philosophy and Phenomenology of the Image at the Academy of Fine Arts in Catania. As a journalist, she has written for La Stampa, Il Giornale di Sicilia, Il Mattino and currently for La Sicilia.

Her novel Un volo magico was published in German by the publishing Lübbe in 1999

Her novels Treintaseimila giorni and Il mistero di Lithian were winners of the Premio Racalmare Sciascia

All her novels are journeys from Sicily to other places outside of Italy.

Novels
Trentaseimila giorni (1996) (Thirty-six Thousand Days) published by Marsilio
Un volo magico (1998) (A Magic Flight) published by Marsilio
Il mistero di Lithian (2004) (The Mystery of Lithian), published by Marsilio

References

External links
Premio Calvino Finalists
Marsilio Editori Presenta Trentaseimila giorni a Milano

1961 births
Italian women novelists
20th-century Italian women writers
21st-century Italian novelists
People of Sicilian descent
Living people
21st-century Italian women